Marciano Aziz (born 13 July 2001) is a Belgian professional footballer who plays as a midfielder for Icelandic Besta deild karla club HK Kópavogur.

Club career

Eupen
A youth product of Eupen since the age of 5, Aziz signed his first professional contract with the club on 18 March 2020. He made his professional debut with Eupen in a 4–0 Belgian First Division A loss to Club Brugge on 16 August 2020, coming on as a substitute in the 77th minute for Knowledge Musona.

MVV (loan)
On 30 July 2021, he joined MVV in the Netherlands on loan.

Afturelding (loan)
On 7 July 2022, Aziz was loaned to Afturelding in Iceland until 30 September 2022.

HK Kópavogur
On 13 January 2023, Aziz signed a two-year contract with newly promoted Icelandic Besta deild karla club HK Kópavogur.

References

External links
 
 ACFF Profile

2001 births
Living people
People from Eupen
Footballers from Liège Province
Association football midfielders
Belgian footballers
Belgium youth international footballers
K.A.S. Eupen players
MVV Maastricht players
Afturelding men's football players
Handknattleiksfélag Kópavogs players
Úrvalsdeild karla (football) players
Belgian Pro League players
Eerste Divisie players
1. deild karla players
Belgian expatriate footballers
Expatriate footballers in the Netherlands
Belgian expatriate sportspeople in the Netherlands
Expatriate footballers in Iceland
Belgian expatriate sportspeople in Iceland